Stockton is an unincorporated community and census-designated place (CDP) in Lanier County, Georgia, United States.

Stockton is located in the far southern portion of the state on U.S. Highway 84, near Valdosta and Lakeland. The surrounding area produces tobacco, turpentine, pine lumber, and pulpwood. Moody Air Force Base is located nearby, and transport is provided mainly by U.S. Route 84 and U.S. Route 129. Stockton is located near the Alapaha River and CSX Transportation runs through Stockton at least twice a day. Stockton's zip code is 31649.

It was first listed as a CDP in the 2020 census with a population of 135.

History
The community was named after one Mr. Stockton, a railroad official. Georgia General Assembly incorporated Stockton as a town in 1876. The town's municipal charter was repealed in 1995.

In 1944 the community was the site of the Stockton train wreck, a train derailment caused by a broken rail in which 47 people were killed.

Demographics

2020 census

Note: the US Census treats Hispanic/Latino as an ethnic category. This table excludes Latinos from the racial categories and assigns them to a separate category. Hispanics/Latinos can be of any race.

References

Former municipalities in Georgia (U.S. state)
Unincorporated communities in Lanier County, Georgia
Census-designated places in Georgia (U.S. state)
Unincorporated communities in Valdosta metropolitan area
Populated places disestablished in 1995